Port Monmouth is an unincorporated community and census-designated place (CDP) within Middletown Township, in Monmouth County, New Jersey, United States. At the 2010 census, the CDP's population was 3,818.

Geography
According to the United States Census Bureau, Port Monmouth had a total area of 1.343 square miles (3.477 km2), including 1.302 square miles (3.371 km2) of land and 0.041 square miles (0.106 km2) of water (3.04%).

Demographics

Census 2010

Census 2000
At the 2000 census there were 3,742 people, 1,289 households, and 964 families living in the CDP. The population density was 2,833.1 people per square mile (1,094.5/km2). There were 1,358 housing units at an average density of 1,028.2/sq mi (397.2/km2). The racial makeup of the CDP was 95.70% White, 1.28% African American, 0.19% Native American, 0.43% Asian, 1.15% from other races, and 1.26% from two or more races. Hispanic or Latino of any race were 6.95% of the population.

Of the 1,289 households 38.9% had children under the age of 18 living with them, 57.7% were married couples living together, 12.3% had a female householder with no husband present, and 25.2% were non-families. 21.1% of households were one person and 11.0% were one person aged 65 or older. The average household size was 2.89 and the average family size was 3.39. 99% of the population in Port Monmouth.

The age distribution was 27.4% under the age of 18, 8.5% from 18 to 24, 32.3% from 25 to 44, 21.4% from 45 to 64, and 10.5% 65 or older. The median age was 35 years. For every 100 females, there were 94.1 males. For every 100 females age 18 and over, there were 91.1 males.

The median household income was $53,864 and the median family income  was $63,375. Males had a median income of $45,565 versus $30,244 for females. The per capita income for the CDP was $21,369. About 8.6% of families and 10.5% of the population were below the poverty line, including 15.3% of those under age 18 and 12.3% of those age 65 or over.

Transportation
NJ Transit offers bus service to Newark on the 61 route and local bus service on the 817 route.

Emergency services
Port Monmouth is served by the Port Monmouth Fire Company #1 and Port Monmouth First Aid Squad which are both located in the CDP.

In media
Port Monmouth was featured in a 1990 episode of Saturday Night Live during a Weekend Update sketch featuring Al Franken covering a cocaine deal in Port Monmouth, NJ. The tugboats Ocean Prince and Newport can be seen in the footage suggesting it was actually filmed locally in New York City for the show as Port Monmouth and neighboring Belford Harbor are home to fishing vessels - which is noted by Al during the sketch. At the time of filming those tugboats were under the Amerada Hess Corporation which had a storage facility and pier in Red Hook, Brooklyn.

Notable people

People who were born in, are residents of, or otherwise closely associated with Port Monmouth include:
 Mike Largey (born 1960), former professional basketball player who played power forward for Hapoel Tel Aviv B.C. of the Israeli Basketball Premier League from 1984 to 1987.

References

Census-designated places in Monmouth County, New Jersey
Middletown Township, New Jersey